Table Mountain pine, Pinus pungens, also called hickory pine, prickly pine, or mountain pine, is a small pine native to the Appalachian Mountains in the United States.

Description
Pinus pungens is a tree of modest size, and has a rounded, irregular shape. The pollen is released early compared to other pines in the area which minimizes hybridization. Sapling trees can bear cones in as little as 5 years.

Buds ovoid to cylindric, red-brown, resinous.

P. pungens prefers dry conditions and is mostly found on rocky slopes, favoring higher elevations, from  altitude. It commonly grows as single scattered trees or small groves, not in large forests like most other pines, and needs periodic disturbances for seedling establishment.

In culture
Pinus pungens is the Lonesome Pine of the 1908 novel The Trail of the Lonesome Pine by John Fox, and popularized in the Laurel and Hardy film Way out West:
On the Blue Ridge Mountains of Virginia
On the Trail of the Lonesome Pine
Several "Lonesome Pine" hiking trails have been waymarked in the Blue Ridge Mountains and elsewhere in the Appalachians.

References

Farjon, A. & Frankis, M. P. (2002). Pinus pungens. Curtis's Botanical Magazine 19: 97-103.

External links
Flora of North America: Pinus pungens info and P. pungens Range Map
Pinus pungens images at bioimages.vanderbilt.edu

Pinus
Pinus taxa by common names
Endemic flora of the United States
Flora of the Appalachian Mountains
Trees of the Northeastern United States
Trees of the Southeastern United States
Least concern flora of the United States